Spilosoma ericsoni is a moth of the family Erebidae. It was described by Georg Semper in 1899. It is found on Borneo.

Males have red forewings and immaculate hindwings. Both wings grade distinctively yellowish at the margin. The forewings of the females are less red and have large black spots in the first two spaces from the dorsum. The hindwings of the female have yellow fringes.

It is considered by some sources to be in genus Spilarctia.

References

Moths described in 1899
ericsoni